The Sound of Music: Music from the NBC Television Event, also known as The Sound of Music: 2013 NBC Television Cast, or sometimes simply The Sound of Music, is a soundtrack album for The Sound of Music Live! released by Sony Masterworks on December 3, 2013. Released in CD and digital download formats, the album includes studio recordings instead of live tracks; the live performance was broadcast two days after the album release. A bonus compilation of nine instrumental tracks from the score was available exclusively through Walmart outlets.  The album peaked at number 17 on the Billboard 200 and number 2 on the Billboard Soundtracks.

Critical reception

Stephen Thomas Erlewine of AllMusic gave the soundtrack three out of five stars and did not give much of a positive review. He stated that the soundtrack "is absent the one quality that made the televised musical so interesting: it is not recorded live; it was cut in the studio" and stated that by doing so the cast are showing how they "are throwing themselves into their roles." Erlewine did however praise them for staying true to the original Broadway musical and the film by stating "the arrangements are faithful to either the original Broadway production or, most often, the 1965 film -- which is appropriate" and concluded by stating "This 2013 staging is a nostalgic celebration of one of the most beloved 20th century musicals and it does right by its source material." Matt Bjorke of Roughstock praised Underwood's vocals stating "She really suits musical theater (much like she’s a classical country singer at heart). Her pure and pristine voice simply shines on songs like "The Sound of Music" and "My Favorite Things" (with Audra McDonald). Bjorke also predicted that the album would do well due to Underwood's appearance on the soundtrack and stating her duets with Moyer and Rinehart "are equally strong and beautifully crafted with musical director/conductor David Chase." He also stated that Borle's, McDonald's and Benanti's appearances would "help the soundtrack give fans something to enjoy long after the live event concludes." Bjorke concluded by stating "This is an iconic Broadway production and while there has been some ‘worry’ that they'll mess it up, this soundtrack should easily put those worries to rest and it should give fans excitement that Carrie Underwood could one day headline a Broadway production if she so chooses to do so."

Track listing

Credits and personnel
Credits and personnel:

On instruments

 John Allred – trombone
 Erin Benim – violin
 Keith Bonner – flute, piccolo
 Laura Bontrager – cello
 David Byrd-Marrow – horn
 Sean Carney – violin 
 Lynne Cohen – oboe, English horn
 Jason Covey – trumpet
 David Creswell – viola
 Jonathan Dinklage – violin
 Dominic Derasse – trumpet
 Carla Fabiani – viola
 Gareth Flowers – trumpet
 Bill Hayes – percussion
 JJ Johnson – viola
 Susan Jolles – harp
 Steve Kenyon – clarinet
 Shinwon Kim – violin
 Aaron Korn – horn
 Adam Krauthamer – horn
 Michael Kuennen – bass
 Scott Kuney – guitar
 Matt Lehmann – violin
 Jonathan Levine – clarinet
 Elizabeth Lim-Dutton – violin
 Lisa Matricardi – violin
 Nat Mayland – trombone
 Maxim Mostom – violin
 Matt Perri – celesta, organ
 Marcus Rojas – tuba
 John Romeri – flute
 Rich Rosenzweig – percussion
 Sarah Seiver – cello
 Daniel Sullivan – bassoon
 Mineko Yajima – violin

Sounding

 Laura Benanti – lead vocals (tracks 8, 14)
 Christian Borle – lead vocals (tracks 8, 14)
 Michael Campayno – lead vocals (track 6)
 Sophia Caruso – children's group vocals (tracks 5, 7, 12, 18-20)
 Peyton Ella – children's group vocals (tracks 5, 7, 12, 18-20)
 Audra McDonald – lead vocals (tracks 1, 3–4, 13, 21), background vocals (3)
 Jessica Molaskey – lead & background vocals (track 3)
 Stephen Moyer – lead vocals (tracks 9, 14–15, 18-20)
 Michael Nigro – children's group vocals (tracks 5, 7, 12, 18-20)
 Christiane Noll – background & additional lead vocals (track 3)
 Ariane Rinehart – lead vocals (track 6, 17), children's group vocals (5, 7, 12, 18-20)
 Grace Rundhaug – children's group vocals (tracks 5, 7, 12, 18-20)
 Elena Shaddow – background & additional lead vocals (track 3)
 The Sound of Music Television Cast Ensemble – choir/chorus
 The Sound of Music Television Orchestra – orchestral accompaniment  (tracks 1–9, 12-21), All instruments performed by (10-11, 22) 
 Carrie Underwood – primary artist, lead vocals (tracks 2, 4–5, 7, 15, 17-20)
 Ella Watts-Gorman – children's group vocals (tracks 5, 7, 12, 18-20)
 Joe West – children's group vocals (tracks 5, 7, 12, 18-20)

 The Nuns of Nonnberg Abbey (background vocals) - Cameron Adams, Margot De La Barre, Wendi Bergamini, Ashley Brown, Stowe Brown, Catherine Brunell, Paula Leggett Chase, Nikki Renee Daniels, Adrienne Danrich, Gina Ferrall, Joy Hermalyn, Leah Horowitz, Autumn Hulbert, Andrea Jones-Sojola, Sydney Morton, Linda Mugleston, Laura Shoop, Georgia Stitt, Rema Webb (tracks 1, 16, 21)

Managerial

 Anixter Rice Music Service - music preparation
 Rob Ashford – stage direction
 David Chase - music direction, music supervisor
 Randy Cohen – keyboard programming
 Reuben Cohen – mastering
 Howard Joines – music coordinator
 Fred Lassen – associate music supervisor
 Jennifer Liebeskind – product development
 Gavin Lurssen – mastering
 Marty Maidenberg – project consultant
 Beth McCarthy-Miller – stage direction
 George Stitt - nun caption
 Janet Weber – recording production manager
 Ian Weinberger – music assistant
 Emily Bruskin Yarbrough - concert master

Technical and production

 Doug Besterman – orchestration, producer
 David Channing – score editor
 David Chase – conductor, producer, synopsis
 Tyler Hartman – assistant engineer, additional vocal recording
 Steven Malone – children's choirmaster
 Neil Meron – executive producer
 Cathleen Murphy – A&R
 Nate Odden – assistant engineer
 Priscilla Taussig – producer
 Frank Wolf – engineer, mixing, producer, recording
 Craig Zadan – executive producer

Visuals and imagery

 Ted Chapin – liner notes
 Russel Crouse – book
 Autumn de Wilde – photography
 Russ Elliott – photography
 Oscar Hammerstein II – lyricist
 Howard Lindsay – book
 Scott McDaniel – cover design
 Nino Muñoz – cover photo
 Patrick Randak – photography
 Richard Rodgers – composer, lyricist (track 15 only)
 Giovanni Rufino – photography
 Federico Ruiz – design
 Robert Trachtenberg – photography

Sales and chart performance
The album debuted on the Billboard 200 chart at number 17 with sales of 38,000. On December 21, 2013 the soundtrack debuted at number 2 on the Billboard Soundtracks chart. The following week the soundtrack held the number 2 spot on the Billboard Soundtracks chart, as well as its third week on the chart.  It has sold 103,000 copies in the US as of January 2, 2014.

Weekly charts

Year-end charts

See also

 Carrie Underwood discography
 List of songs recorded by Carrie Underwood

References

External links
 

2013 soundtrack albums
Classical music soundtracks
Television soundtracks
The Sound of Music
Trapp family